Goo Hara (January 3, 1991 – November 24, 2019), also known mononymously as Hara, was a South Korean pop singer and actress. She was a member of the girl group Kara, and had also appeared in television dramas including City Hunter (2011). She made her debut as a soloist in July 2015 with the release of her EP Alohara (Can You Feel It?). After Kara disbanded in 2016, she continued her solo career at another agency, KeyEast. Her solo career was interrupted in 2018 after she became embroiled in a legal case with her ex-boyfriend, Choi Jong-Bum, which was initiated when he assaulted Goo and threatened to release their sex video to harm her career. In June 2019, she continued her solo activities in Japan where she was well received by fans. Her last release was a maxi single "Midnight Queen", released on September 19, 2019.

Goo's death, ruled as a possible suicide on November 24, 2019, brought worldwide attention to sexual crimes against women in South Korea, one of which was the usage of molka (spy cameras) to discreetly capture voyeuristic images and videos of women. In response several petitions were submitted to the Blue House. One petition demanded a more severe punishment for filming sexual acts without consent and distributing it, and the other represented a need to revise South Korea's inheritance laws to prevent absent parents from claiming inheritance from their neglected children. The inheritance laws were amended on December 1, 2020, with the bill carrying amendments titled "Goo Hara Act". As the amended law could not be applied retrospectively, Goo's brother Goo Ho-in filed a lawsuit against their mother, who was said to have neglected her parental duties, to prevent her from claiming inheritance from Goo Hara's estate. The court awarded their mother 40% of the estate.

Life and career

Early life and education
Goo was born on January 3, 1991, in Gwangju, South Korea. Goo's parents separated when she was eight years old after her mother abandoned the family. Goo and her brother were raised by their grandmother while their father was working as a construction worker around the country to support the family. Goo came to Seoul while attending  and participated in SM Entertainment's youth appearance tournament in 2005. During her school days, she worked as a model for internet clothing stores. In 2007, she unsuccessfully auditioned to join JYP Entertainment.

2008–2015: Kara 

Goo joined the girl group Kara in 2008, following the departure of former member Kim Sung-hee. In October 2009, she became a cast member of the KBS reality show Invincible Youth. On January 5, 2010, during an appearance on the SBS reality show Strong Heart, Goo admitted that she had had dental and minor facial cosmetic surgery. She stated that she had always had double eyelids, but had surgery to make them more defined.

In 2011, Goo made her acting debut in SBS City Hunter, where she starred as Choi Da-hye, the daughter of South Korea's president. On January 19, 2011, it was announced that Goo would be terminating her contract with her label DSP Media along with three other members of Kara, and a lawsuit was filed on their behalf. Later that day, it was announced that she would discontinue her involvement with the suit and had rejoined the company, as she apparently was not fully aware of the lawsuit's details. In November 2011, she and Nicole Jung (a fellow member of Kara) became the new MCs for Inkigayo, and they left the show on August 19, 2012, to focus on Kara's comeback.

In 2013, Goo collaborated with Japanese musician and songwriter Masaharu Fukuyama to record a song called "Magic of Love" in Korean under the project group, Hara+. The song was used as a soundtrack for FujiTV's drama Galileo, in which Fukuyama starred. In October 2013, she was appointed as the blood donation ambassador for the Hanmaum Blood Bank. On December 29, 2014, she appeared in her own reality show titled On & Off, which aired on MBC Music.

Alohara (Can You Feel It)
In January 2015, Goo started hosting KBS' idol beauty show A Style For You along with Super Junior's Kim Heechul, EXID's Hani and Sistar's Bora. In June 2015, she released a beauty book titled Nail Hara. In July 2015, Goo debuted as a solo artist with the release of the EP Alohara (Can You Feel It?), which peaked at #4 domestically. The lead single "Choco Chip Cookies" features South Korean rapper Giriboy. In October 2015, Goo joined the variety show Shaolin Clenched Fists.

2016–2019: Final projects before death
On January 15, 2016, Kara disbanded due to Goo and fellow members Park Gyu-ri and Han Seung-yeon leaving DSP Media upon the expiration of their contracts with the company. Goo then signed with KeyEast a few days later to pursue a solo career. In December 2016, she featured in Thunder's single, "Sign". In August 2017, Goo starred in a web movie titled Sound of a Footstep. In November 2017, she joined the variety show Seoul Mate.

In January 2018, Goo released a soundtrack for the drama Jugglers, titled "On A Good Day". In April 2018, she hosted the JTBC's beauty show My Mad Beauty Diary. In July, she was named honorary ambassador for the 6th Animal Film Festival. In August 2018, Goo debuted as a soloist in Japan, releasing the song "Wild". Beginning in October 2018, Goo and her ex-boyfriend, Choi Jong-bum, became involved in a legal dispute that extended into 2019. The nature of the dispute caused issues in both her professional and personal life, including Content Y (a subsidiary of KeyEast that Goo had been actively promoting under since 2017), declining to renew her contract following its expiration in January 2019. Goo had previously enjoyed popularity in Japan when Kara was still active and being promoted in Japan, having participated in 62nd NHK Kōhaku Uta Gassen.

Goo's final release prior to her death was the maxi single "Midnight Queen", which was released in September 2019. She also embarked on a mini tour, titled Hara Zepp Tour 2019: Hello, to support the album. The tour consisted of four concert dates held across Japan in November 2019, ending on the 19th. Goo had a successful solo career in Japan and was well received by her Japanese fans during the mini tour. On January 12, 2020, the music video for "Hello", a B-side track from "Midnight Queen", was released posthumously. Its lyrics were penned by Goo to thank her supporters, and the video featured her against the night-time cityscape of Tokyo, which she had loved. As a follow up to the music video, a photobook, memorializing Goo with photos taken just before her death, was released posthumously on April 6, 2020.

Personal life

Domestic dispute with Choi Jong-Bum 
Goo dated hairdresser Choi Jong-Bum after the two first met on the set of the beauty TV program My Mad Beauty Diary. At around 1 a.m. of September 13, 2018, a drunken Choi broke into Goo's house while she was sleeping and started an argument that escalated into violent assault, when he allegedly tried to break up with her. The police arrived at Goo's house after Choi reported her for assault. Goo claimed that the incident was two-sided and then both parties posted images of their injuries to the internet to explain their side of the story. After the incident, Goo underwent a medical examination, and she was found to be suffering from uterus and vagina hemorrhage, and was also diagnosed with "cervical sprain", "facial contusions and sprain", "lower leg contusions and sprain", and "right forearm and additional sprains." Following this, Goo filed a lawsuit against Choi for threatening to release a sex video filmed without her consent in an attempt by him to end her career.

In the first trial session held on April 18, 2019, Choi was presented with the charges of filming the sex video, injury, intimidation, coercion, and property damage. Choi denied all charges except destruction of property. On May 26, 2019, Goo attempted suicide in her apartment and was immediately taken to the hospital, after which she apologized for worrying her fans. As a result, Goo did not attend the second trial session on May 30, 2019. She was originally scheduled to appear as a witness in court. In the third trial session on July 18, 2019, the presiding judge, Oh Duk-Shik, requested that the video be submitted as evidence to the court as the content in the video was disputed. After objections from Goo's lawyers over the possibility that the public might view the video in court, the judge viewed the video privately in his chamber to confirm the content of the video. Additionally, Goo testified to Oh in private for two hours as well.

In August 2019, Choi was acquitted of the charge of filming the sex video without permission as the court agreed that the filming was done without her consent, but because she remained in the relationship they found him not guilty of illicit filming. However, he was sentenced to one year and six months in prison, suspended for three years after probation, after being convicted of threatening to upload the sex video, coercion, physical assault, and destroying Goo's property. After news of her sex video went public, Goo was harassed online on social media, despite being the victim of a crime. Upon closure of an appeal to the suspended sentence on July 2, 2020, Choi was sentenced to a year in prison, with the court stating that Choi "was well aware that the degree of damage would be very serious if the sex videos were leaked, given that the victim was a famous celebrity". The prosecution team appealed to the Supreme Court for a heavier sentence on July 8, 2020. On September 23, Choi applied for bail while awaiting for the decision from the Supreme Court over the prosecution's appeal that was set for October 15. The Supreme Court denied his bail stating, "There is no significant reason to grant bail for Choi Jong-Bum. This decision was made with the consensus of the Supreme Court Justices involved." The Supreme Court upheld the one-year sentence on October 15, 2020.

Death, investigation and commemoration
On November 24, 2019, Hara was found dead at her home in Cheongdam-dong, Gangnam by her manager, with the cause of death ruled as a possible suicide. Police found a suicide note written by Goo, and concluded that there was no foul play, as she was seen on CCTV footage returning home at 12:40 am, with no further visitors except for the housekeeper who found her body at 6 p.m. the same day. An autopsy was not performed after the police consulted the prosecutor in-charge and took into consideration her family's request. The body was handed over to her family on November 26. Goo's death occurred little over a month after her close friend Sulli had committed suicide.

Legacy 

Goo’s death brought worldwide attention to sexual crimes against women in South Korea. Following her death, a petition was submitted to the Blue House with over 200,000 signatures demanding a more severe punishment for filming sexual acts without consent and distributing it. Moreover, it was revealed that Goo had helped reporter Kang Kyung-yoon investigate Jung Joon-young's chatroom case prior to her death.

Petition to revise inheritance law and the Goo Hara Act 
Goo Hara's elder brother, Goo Ho-in, started a petition to revise South Korea's inheritance law, to prevent a parent from claiming inheritance if they had neglected their parental duties, after being contacted by their estranged mother for a share of Goo Hara's inheritance. The petition was successful, after gathering 100,000 signatures in 30 days. Goo Ho-in then pushed the legislature to introduce the law in Goo Hara's name, as the Goo Hara Act. However, the bill failed to pass in the 20th National Assembly, claiming that it needed further review. The 21st National Assembly continued to look into the prospective law. At the plenary session held on December 1, 2020, the revised law was passed by the 21st National Assembly, along with other unrelated bills.

Inheritance lawsuit 
Goo Ho-in also filed a lawsuit to prevent their mother from seeking 50% of Goo Hara's assets as inheritance, as she reportedly did not fulfill her parental duties to the siblings. The revised law would not be applicable against their mother's claim, due to another law preventing retrospective application of new laws on old cases. Their father passed his claim of the inheritance to Goo Ho-in. On December 22, 2020, the Gwangju Family Court ruled that their mother would receive 40% of the inheritance while Goo Ho-in would receive the remaining 60%.

Fundraiser for single parent families 
On the second anniversary of Goo Hara's death in 2021, Goo Ho-in announced that he would auction 10 oil paintings done by Goo Hara of which proceeds would partially be donated to a Japanese non-profit organisation, Florence, whose primary clients are of single parent families.

Discography

Extended plays

Singles

Other appearances

Filmography

Film

Television series

Television shows

Events hosting

Awards and nominations

References

External links

 Goo Hara official website  at Production Ogi 
 
 

1991 births
2019 deaths
Japanese-language singers of South Korea
Kara (South Korean group) members
People from Gwangju
South Korean dance musicians
South Korean women pop singers
South Korean female idols
South Korean radio presenters
South Korean rhythm and blues singers
South Korean television actresses
South Korean television presenters
South Korean women television presenters
Sungshin Women's University alumni
DSP Media artists
South Korean women radio presenters
21st-century South Korean actresses
21st-century South Korean women singers
Suicides in South Korea
Victims of cyberbullying
2019 suicides
Female suicides